2-Methyl-1-pentanol (IUPAC name: 2-methylpentan-1-ol) is an organic chemical compound. It is used as a solvent and an intermediate in the manufacture of other chemicals.

References 

Alcohol solvents
Hexanols